This is a chronological list of the battles involving France from the reign of Clovis I (481–511) to the ongoing military operations.

This list does not include the battles of the French civil wars (as the Wars of Religion, the Fronde, the War in the Vendée) unless a foreign country is involved; this list includes neither the peacekeeping operations (such as Operation Artemis, Opération Licorne) nor the humanitarian missions supported by the French Armed Forces.

Middle Ages (481–1492)

Renaissance (1492–1598)

Ancien Régime (1610–1789)

Modern history (1789–present)

See also
Military history of France
List of wars involving France
French Armed Forces
Deployments of the French military

Wars and battles
Battles
French wars and battles
French wars and battles
Battles involving France